Nayi (also known as "Nao") is an Omotic language of the Afro-Asiatic language family spoken in western Ethiopia.  
Most of the speakers of the language live in two separated areas. The largest grouping live in Decha woreda of the Keffa Zone. The nearest city to their region is Bonga. A few in Dulkuma village of the Shoa Bench woreda, some in Sheko woreda having moved there in 1976-1977 as a result of conflicts between local feudal lords and the military government (Aklilu 2002:4). In Decha, young people no longer speak the language.

The language is notable for its retroflex consonants (Aklilu Yilma 1988), a striking feature shared with closely related Dizi, Sheko and nearby (but not closely related) Bench.  The language has 5 vowels that can be long or short.  The question of the status of a short mid central vowel is still unresolved. There are three phonemic tones and syllabic nasal consonants. There are ejective stops and affricates, but no implosives (Aklilu 2002:6,7).

Nayi, together with the Dizi and Sheko languages, is part of a cluster of languages variously called "Maji" or "Dizoid".

Notes

References
Aklilu Yilma. 1990.  Two phonological processes in Nayi: palatalization and labialization. In Tadesse Beyene, Richard Pankhurst, Ahmed Zekaria, eds., Proceedings of the Firstr National Conference of Ethiopian Studies.  Addis Ababa: Addis Ababa University.
Aklilu Yilma. 1994. "A sketch of the Nayi grammar."  S.L.L.E. linguistic reports 16: 1-20.
Aklilu Yilma. 2002. "Sociolinguistic survey report of the Nayi language of Ethiopia."  SIL Electronic Survey Reports 2002-010.
 Aklilu Yilma and Ralph Siebert. 1995. "Survey of Chara, Dime, Melo and Nayi, part 1."  S.L.L.E. linguistic reports 25: 2-8.

External links
 Nayi basic lexicon at the Global Lexicostatistical Database

Languages of Ethiopia

Dizoid languages